Next Exit is a studio album by American jazz saxophonist Grover Washington Jr. The album was released in 1992 on Columbia Records label. Next Exit includes composition "Summer Chill" which was co-written by his son and nominated for a Grammy.

Reception
Steve Aldrich of AllMusic commented "The man who wrote the book on R&B/fusion returns with yet another set of what he does best. Washington's sax shares time with vocal tracks featuring the likes of Nancy Wilson, Lalah Hathaway, and the Four Tops. A solid, if predictible outing". A reviewer of All About Jazz stated "Any Grover excursion is worth listening to and Next Exit is one of Grover's finer outings... There are so many wonderful tracks on this album that it is an essential addition to your own collection of you don't have it already. Fusion Jazz at its very finest and highly recommended by this veteran of the airwaves".

Track listing

Personnel 
 Grover Washington Jr. – alto saxophone (1, 3, 7, 11), tenor saxophone (2, 4, 5, 8, 9), soprano saxophone (3, 6, 10), arrangements (4), horn section (5, 8, 10), horn arrangements (5, 8, 11), backing vocals (10)
 John Bolden – keyboards (1, 5, 7, 10), keyboard bass (1, 5, 7, 10), percussion (1, 5, 7, 10), rhythm arrangements (1, 5, 7, 10), vocal arrangements (1, 7), horn arrangements (5, 10), drum programming (10), backing vocals (10)
 Teddy Bolden – keyboards (1, 5, 7, 10), drum programming (1, 5, 7, 10), percussion (1, 5, 7, 10), rhythm arrangements (1, 5, 7, 10), vocal arrangements (1, 7), horn arrangements (5, 10), backing vocals (10)
 Donald Robinson – keyboards (2), arrangements (2)
 Sergio George – acoustic piano (3), synthesizers (3), backing vocals (3), arrangements (3)
 Ramsey Lewis – grand piano (4)
 James McBride – keyboards (4), programming (4)
 Bill Jolly – keyboard programming (6), MIDI programming (6), arrangements (6)
 James Lloyd – keyboards (8, 11), keyboard bass (8)
 Bob Baldwin – keyboards (9), MIDI programming (9), drum programming (9), arrangements (9)
 Curtis Dowd – keyboards (11)
 Randy Bowland – guitar (2)
 Richard Lee Steacker – guitar (4, 6, 8, 11), arrangements (11)
 Doc Powell – guitar (7)
 Rodney Millon – guitar (10)
 Gerald Veasley – bass (2, 4, 6, 9)
 Ruben Rodriguez – bass (3)
 Cornelius Mims – bass (5)
 Keith Roster – bass (7, 10)
 Jim Salamone – drum programming (2, 8, 11), percussion programming (2), keyboard programming (8, 11), E-mu Emulator III programming (8, 11), sequencing (8, 11), arrangements (8, 11)
 Darryl Washington – drums (6)
 Robert Allende – percussion (3)
 Leonard Gibbs – percussion (4)
 Miguel Fuentes – percussion (6), congas (8)
 Kathleen Thomas – strings (2)
 Lewis Kahn – trombone (3)
 Jose "Ite" Jerez – trumpet (3)
 Grover Washington III – arrangements (8)
 Rich Figueroa – backing vocals (1, 7)
 Dionne Knighton – backing vocals (1, 7)
 Latesha Theirry – backing vocals (1, 7)
 Claude Woods – backing vocals (1, 7)
 Nancy Wilson – lead vocals (2)
 Annette Hardeman – backing vocals (2)
 Paula Holloway – backing vocals (2), lead vocals (11)
 Michelle Kornegay – backing vocals (2)
 Gabriela Anders – backing vocals (3)
 Chip Landry – backing vocals (3)
 Ray Sepúlveda – backing vocals (3)
 Lalah Hathaway – lead and backing vocals (7)
 Levi Stubbs – lead vocals (9)
 The Four Tops – backing vocals (9)
 Bunny Sigler – vocal arrangements and conductor (9)
 Doug E. Fresh – human beatbox (11)
 Man Slaughter – rap (11)

Strings on "Love Like This"
 Suzie Katayama – arrangements and conductor 
 Sid Page – concertmaster, violin
 Maurice Grants – cello 
 Roger Lebow – cello 
 Joel Derouin – violin 
 Berj Garabedian – violin 
 Vanessa Kibbe – violin

Production 
 George Butler – executive producer 
 Grover Washington, Jr. – producer (1, 4-8, 10, 11), mixing (4, 6, 9)
 John Bolden – co-producer (1, 5, 7, 10), mixing (1, 5, 7, 10)
 Teddy Bolden – co-producer (1, 5, 7, 10), mixing (1, 5, 7, 10)
 Donald Robinson – producer (2), mixing (2)
 Sergio George – producer (3), mixing (3)
 Jim Salamone – co-producer (8, 11), recording (8, 11), mixing (8, 11)
 Grover Washington III – co-producer (8)
 Bob Baldwin – producer (9)
 Richard Lee Steacker – co-producer (11)
 Al Phillips – recording (1, 5, 7, 10), mixing (1, 5, 7, 10)
 Martin Schmelzle – recording (1, 5)
 Al Alberts, Jr. – recording (2), mixing (2)
 John "Fig" Ficarotta – recording (3)
 Peter Humphreys – recording (3-7, 10), mixing (4, 6, 9), mastering 
 David Lescoe – recording (3), mixing (3)
 Dan McKay – recording (7)
 Marty Lester – recording (7)
 Glenn Barratt – recording (8, 11), mixing (11)
 Mike Iacopelli – vocal recording (9)
 Scott MacMinn – recording (11)
 Bruce Weedon – mixing (8)
 Joe Nicolo – mixing (11)
 Brian Wittmer – assistant engineer (5, 7, 10)
 Craig Caruth – assistant engineer (8, 11)
 Yuval Kossovsky – assistant engineer (11)
 Ray Monahan – Pro Tools editing (11)
 Nimitr Sarkananda – mastering 
 Paul Silverthorn – production coordinator 
 Diane Delgado-Jorge – production assistant 
 Mike Traylor – production assistant 
 Elieen Whelihan – production assistant 
 Carol Chen – art direction, design 
 Frank Schramm – photography

Charts

Weekly charts

Year-end charts

References

1992 albums
Columbia Records albums
Grover Washington Jr. albums